WNLA (1390 AM), is a radio station licensed to serve Indianola, Mississippi, United States. The station is owned by Delta Radio Network, LLC.

WNLA broadcasts a Gospel music format to the greater Greenville, Mississippi, area.

On May 7, 2014, WNLA filed an application for a U.S. Federal Communications Commission (FCC) construction permit to change frequency to 1390 kHz, increase day power to 1,000 watts and decrease night power to 15 watts.

History
In August 1984, Fritts Broadcasting, Inc., reached an agreement to sell this station to Shamrock Broadcasting, Inc. The deal was approved by the FCC on October 9, 1984, and the transaction was consummated on October 15, 1984.

In April 2007, Shamrock Broadcasting, Inc., contracted to sell this station and FM sister station WNLA-FM to Debut Broadcasting Corporation, Inc. The deal was approved by the FCC on May 22, 2007, and the transaction was completed on June 7, 2007. The stations were sold to Delta Radio Network in 2011.

References

External links
Corporate Website
Official website

Gospel radio stations in the United States
Sunflower County, Mississippi
Radio stations established in 1953
1953 establishments in Mississippi
NLA